Sherry Romanado  (born April 12, 1974) is a school administrator, public relations officer and Canadian politician. She is a Canadian politician, who was elected to represent the riding of Longueuil—Charles-LeMoyne in the House of Commons of Canada in the 2015 Canadian federal election.

On January 30, 2017, she was named Parliamentary Secretary to the Minister of Veterans Affairs and Associate Minister of National Defence, which she held until August 30, 2018. On August 31, 2018 she was named Parliamentary Secretary to the Minister of Seniors, which she held for the remainder of the 42nd Parliament. After her reelection in the 2019 federal election, Romando was appointed chair of the Industry, Science and Technology committee.

After being reelected in the 2021 federal election, Romanado was appointed Deputy Leader of the Government in the House of Commons.

Electoral record

References

External links

Living people
Liberal Party of Canada MPs
People from Longueuil
Members of the House of Commons of Canada from Quebec
Women members of the House of Commons of Canada
Women in Quebec politics
Canadian public relations people
21st-century Canadian politicians
1974 births
21st-century Canadian women politicians